Toldi Falls (Portuguese: Cachoeira do Toldi) is a waterfall located in the municipality of São Bento do Sapucaí, São Paulo, Brazil.

References

Landforms of São Paulo (state)
Waterfalls of Brazil